Park Bong-Duk (also Pak Bong-Deok, ; born September 23, 1973 in Seoul) is a South Korean sport shooter. He won two bronze medals in the men's 50 m rifle three positions at the 1998 Asian Games in Bangkok, Thailand, and at the 2002 Asian Games in Busan, South Korea, with scores of 1,247 and 1,256.8 points, respectively. He also competed for two rifle shooting events (prone and three positions) at the 2004 Summer Olympics in Athens, but he neither reached the final round, nor claimed an Olympic medal.

Four years after competing in his first Olympics, Park qualified for his second South Korean team, as a 35-year-old, at the 2008 Summer Olympics in Beijing, by placing third for the 50 m rifle prone (FR60PR) from the 2007 Asian Shooting Championships in Kuwait City, Kuwait. Park also received additional places for the 10 m air rifle (AR40) and 50 m rifle 3 positions (STR3X20); therefore, he competed for all rifle shooting events.

In his first event, 10 m air rifle, Park was able to hit a total of 593 points within six attempts, finishing sixteenth in the qualifying rounds. Few days later, he placed forty-third in the 50 m rifle prone, by one target ahead of Canada's Johannes Sauer from the fifth attempt, with a total score of 587 points. In his third and last event, 50 m rifle 3 positions, Park was able to shoot 398 targets in a prone position, 373 in standing, and 388 in kneeling, for a total score of 1,159 points, finishing only in thirty-first place.

Olympic results

References

External links
NBC 2008 Olympics profile

South Korean male sport shooters
Living people
Olympic shooters of South Korea
Shooters at the 2004 Summer Olympics
Shooters at the 2008 Summer Olympics
Asian Games medalists in shooting
Shooters at the 1998 Asian Games
Shooters at the 2002 Asian Games
Shooters at the 2006 Asian Games
Shooters at the 2014 Asian Games
Sport shooters from Seoul
1973 births
Asian Games silver medalists for South Korea
Asian Games bronze medalists for South Korea
Medalists at the 1998 Asian Games
Medalists at the 2002 Asian Games
Medalists at the 2006 Asian Games
Medalists at the 2014 Asian Games
20th-century South Korean people
21st-century South Korean people